Crawling Back to You may refer to:
"Crawling Back to You" (Backstreet Boys song), 2005
"Crawling Back to You" (Daughtry song), 2011
"Crawling Back to You", a 1994 song by Tom Petty from Wildflowers